Belgium competed at the 2013 Summer Universiade in Kazan, Russia.

Medalists

With these results Belgium achieved the 39th place out of 162 participating countries in the medals table.

Athletics

Belgium was represented by six competitors in athletics.

Men

Decathlon

Women

Badminton

Belgium was represented by three badminton players.

Men

Women

Boxing

Belgium was represented by one boxer.

Fencing

Belgium was represented by three competitors in fencing.

Men

Women

Gymnastics

Belgium was represented in both artistic gymnastics and rhythmic gymnastics.

Artistic gymnastics
Two gymnasts competed in the artistic gymnastics competition.

Rhythmic gymnastics
One gymnast competed in the rhythmic gymnastics competition for Belgium.

Judo

Belgium was represented by three female and one male judoka.

Rowing

Belgium was represented by two rowers.

Rugby sevens

Belgium was represented by a men's team.

Men
The men's team participated in Group B.

Team roster

Head coach: Nicolas Le Roux
Team manager: Monique Petitjean

Preliminary round

Quarterfinals

Plate tier

Table Tennis

Belgium was represented by three competitors in table tennis.

Water polo

Belgium was represented by a men's team.

Men
The men's team participated in Group B.

Team roster

Head coach: Niculae Fulgeanu
Assistant coach: Bernard Pollak

Preliminary round

Classification round

Final rank: 12

Weightlifting

Belgium was represented by one female weightlifter.

Women

Nations at the 2013 Summer Universiade
2013